Laven is a Mon–Khmer dialect cluster of southern Laos. Laven is the exonym given by the Laotian government, while the autonym of many of those speakers is Jru' . Varieties are:

Jru' (also spelled Jruq)
Juk
Su' (also spelled Suq)

Laven varieties are described in detail by Therapan L-Thongkum and Paul Sidwell (2003).

Further reading
Sidwell, Paul. 2019. Reconstructing language contact and social change on Boloven Plateau, Laos. Presented at ALMSEA (The Anthropology of Language in Mainland Southeast Asia), University of Sydney, Aug. 19-20. (Slides).

References

Sidwell, Paul (2003). A Handbook of comparative Bahnaric, Vol. 1: West Bahnaric. Pacific Linguistics, 551. Canberra: Research School of Pacific and Asian Studies, Australian National University.

Bahnaric languages
Languages of Laos